Gérard Gili (born 7 August 1952) is a French football manager and former player.

Gili's highest profile appointment was as manager of Ivory Coast. He was named as the Ivorians' head coach in January 2008, following the resignation of Ulrich Stielike due to personal reasons on the eve of the 2008 Africa Cup of Nations.  Gili was promoted from within, having been a former coach of the country's Under-23 side with whom he qualified for the 2008 Olympics in Beijing.

After leaving the Ivory Coast job, Gili was named manager of Qatari side Umm Salal, but he was sacked in 2010, leaving him unemployed for a year. However, he was reinstated on 15 December 2011 after Umm Salal sacked Moroccan coach Hassan Harmatallah 'for unhealthy working environment'. The team was at the bottom of the table with no wins so far in mid-season. After the 2011–12 season, Gili was replaced by another French coach Bertrand Marchand.

During his playing career he was a goalkeeper for Olympique de Marseille.

Career statistics

Head coach

Honours

As a manager
Marseille
Ligue 1: 1988–89, 1989–90
Coupe de France: 1988–89

References

 Stats

1952 births
Living people
Footballers from Marseille
French footballers
Association football goalkeepers
Ligue 1 players
Olympique de Marseille players
SC Bastia players
FC Rouen players
Olympique Alès players
French football managers
Olympique de Marseille managers
FC Girondins de Bordeaux managers
Montpellier HSC managers
SC Bastia managers
Egypt national football team managers
Ivory Coast national football team managers
Umm Salal SC managers
Ligue 1 managers
Expatriate football managers in Egypt
Expatriate football managers in Qatar
2000 African Cup of Nations managers
2008 Africa Cup of Nations managers